This is a list of members of the Victorian Legislative Council from the elections of 15 August – 15 November 1876 to the elections of 17 August to 16 September 1878.

There were six Electoral Provinces and five members elected to each Province.

Note the "Term in Office" refers to that members term(s) in the Council, not necessarily for that Province.

William Mitchell was President of the Council, Caleb Jenner was Chairman of Committees.

 Murphy resigned November 1876, replaced by Robert Dyce Reid the same month.

References

 Re-member (a database of all Victorian MPs since 1851). Parliament of Victoria.

Members of the Parliament of Victoria by term
19th-century Australian politicians